Gandondu Hennaru is a 1969 Indian Kannada-language film, directed and produced by B. R. Panthulu. The film stars Rajkumar, Bharathi Vishnuvardhan, Narasimharaju and Mynavathi. The film has musical score by T. G. Lingappa. The movie was remade in Tamil in 1972 as Raman Thediya Seethai.

Plot 
A man visits a happy elderly couple who advise him that a wife must have 6 good qualities. These qualities help her build a happy family. He searches for a woman with those qualities. After being tricked and turned around, he finds his soulmate and returns to get the blessings of the elderly couple.

Cast 

Rajkumar as Anand Rao
Bharathi Vishnuvardhan as Veena
Narasimharaju
Mynavathi
Balakrishna
Ramadevi
Dinesh
Premalatha
H. Ramachandra Shastry as Veena's father
Renuka
Hanumanthachar
Suguna
P. Gundu Rao
Muguru Jejamma
Ganapathi Bhat
Nagappa
Guggu
B. R. Panthulu
Puttaswamy
Narayana Rao
Shankar
Ranganath
Siddaramaiah

Soundtrack 
T. G. Lingappa composed all the tracks. All songs became hits.

Reception 
The movie saw a theatrical run for more than 100 days and ran over 125 days in STATES theater Bangalore.

References

External links 
 

1969 films
1960s Kannada-language films
Films scored by T. G. Lingappa
Films directed by B. R. Panthulu
Kannada films remade in other languages